Åbo Underrättelser is a Swedish language newspaper published in Turku, Finland.

History and profile
Åbo Underrättelser is the oldest newspaper still in print in Finland, founded by Christian Ludvig Hjelt in 1823. The first edition of the paper was published on 3 January 1824.

Åbo Underrättelser is published five times per week, from Tuesday to Saturday, and has its headquarters in Turku (Åbo in Swedish). 

The newspaper's primary readership consists of Swedish-speakers in Turku and Åboland. IThe paper sold 7,562 copies in 2009.

See also
 Media of Finland

References

External links
Åbo Underrättelser website
The Finnish Historical Newspaper Library 1771-1910 - on-line library  from 1824 to 1910

1823 establishments in Finland
Daily newspapers published in Finland
Mass media in Turku
Publications established in 1823
Swedish-language newspapers published in Finland